The Shanghai Oriental Art Center, abbreviated SHOAC, is one of the leading performance and cultural facilities in Shanghai. The five interconnected hemispherical halls or "petals" are shaped to resemble a butterfly orchid from above. They comprise the Entrance Hall, the Concert Hall, the Opera Hall, the Performance Hall, and the Exhibition Hall. The high-tech ceiling changes color during the night to reflect the nature of the performances inside. Located off Century Avenue in Pudong, the SHOAC was opened with a New Year's Eve concert in 2004 and officially opened on July 1, 2005.

History
The facility was jointly constructed by the Shanghai Municipal Government and Pudong New Area Government on a budget of 1.1 billion RMB. The right to operate its grounds were won by the Poly Culture and Arts Company in September 2003; they then partnered with the Wenhui-Xinmin United Press Group to establish the Shanghai Oriental Art Center Management Company, Limited. This company continues to manage the property and its subsidiary facilities, despite Poly's interest having been replaced by Beijing Poly Theatre Management in June 2009 and WXUPG's by the Shanghai United Media Group in January 2014.

Performances
Various cultural and musical performances are held in the center, beginning from the 2005 Berlin Philharmonic Orchestra Shanghai Concert. It's a regular venue for concert performances and its popular "Chinese Traditional Opera Series" hosts performances by the China National Opera, the Shanghai Jingju Theatre Company and Shanghai Kunqu Company, and the Shanghai Yueju Opera Troupe. The OAC's Saturday Brunch Concerts claim audiences of over  every year.

Facilities

Architecture
The building was designed by French architect Paul Andreu and the Huadong Architectural Design & Research Institute. The façades are mainly laminated glass incorporating perforated metal sheets. The dark granite floors and multi-layered glass screen walls aim to create a softly diffused forest floor effect. The separate "petals" of the construction are hung with large distinctly colored pebbles to differentiate them. The backstage facilities include an Orchestra Rehearsal Hall, Choir Rehearsal Hall, Dance Rehearsal Hall, and Integrated Rehearsal Hall.

Concert Hall
The Concert Hall has 1953 seats, a computer-controlled elevating stage, and an 88-diapason 5-layer organ by Austria's Rieger Pipe Organ. It houses 2 VIP and 7 regular dressing rooms.

Opera Hall
The Opera Hall has 1015 seats, divided into three areas and designed to recreate the intimate experience of Italian opera houses. The central stage provides computer-controlled side, ice, and ballet platforms in addition to the main large-scale platform. It houses 2 VIP and 15 common dressing rooms.

Performance Hall
The Performance Hall has 333 seats and is modeled on semicircular Roman theaters. Its performance floor is golden Swiss pearwood. It has 4 dressing rooms.

Exhibition Hall
The Exhibition Hall is located on the second floor of its petal of the Oriental Art Center.

Other facilities
The venue also features ancillary public facilities, including the 100-seat Paris Shanghai French restaurant open daily for lunch and dinner, the  Café Salon Etoile and an adjacent gift store, and 11 piano training classrooms. The Shanghai Gallery of Antique Music Boxes and Automata is located at the SHOAC, displaying over 200 antique music boxes and European automata, including the oldest extant music box in the world, constructed in 1796 by Antoine Favre-Salomon.

Outreach
The Oriental Art Center engages with the broader public through free admission days every month, reduced-fare student tickets, and weekly lectures on art and music appreciation.

References

External links
 Official website

Buildings and structures in Shanghai
Tourist attractions in Shanghai
Opera houses in China
Theatres in Shanghai
Culture in Shanghai
Pudong